Richard A. Klatt (born 1951) is a retired American swimmer who won a gold medal as a member of the first-place U.S. team in the men's 4×200-meter freestyle relay at the 1973 World Aquatics Championships in Belgrade, Yugoslavia, setting a new world record in the relay event (7:33.22).

After retiring from swimming, he worked for more than 30 years as a swimming and water polo coach. Today, he is the head coach at the Fresno Dolphins Swim Team.  His son Daniel Klatt is a former Olympic water polo player and an assistant water polo coach for the national women's team.

See also
 World record progression 4 × 200 metres freestyle relay

References

1951 births
Living people
American male freestyle swimmers
New Mexico Lobos athletes
World Aquatics Championships medalists in swimming